This list comprises all players who have participated in at least one league match for the Columbus Crew since the team's first Major League Soccer season in 1996. Players who were on the roster but never appeared in a game are not listed; players who appeared for the team in other competitions (US Open Cup, CONCACAF Champions League, etc.) but never actually made an MLS appearance are noted at the bottom of the page.

A "†" denotes players who only appeared in a single match.

A
  Saad Abdul-Salaam
  Mohammed Abu
  Lalas Abubakar
  Ubusuku Abukusumo
  David Accam
  Kevin Adams
  Fanendo Adi
  Harrison Afful
  Nelson Akwari
  Fatai Alashe
  Jalil Anibaba †
  Bernardo Añor
  Luis Argudo
  Jairo Arrieta
  Steve Armas
  Stephen Armstrong
  Corey Ashe
  Artur

B
  Fifi Baiden †
  Rich Balchan
  Devin Barclay
  Guillermo Barros Schelotto
  Chad Barson
  Shane Battelle
  Adam Bedell
  Joe Bendik
  Sebastian Berhalter
  Miguel Berry
  Chris Birchall
  Leonard Bisaku
  Brian Bliss
  Emmanuel Boateng
  Tenywa Bonseu
  Eric Brunner
  Edson Buddle
  Marc Burch
  Kevin Burns
  Jon Busch
  Evan Bush
  Altimont Butler †

C
  Chris Cadden
  Paul Caligiuri
  Knox Cameron
  Sergio Campbell †
  Scott Cannon
  Marcelo Carrera
  Brian Carroll
  Conor Casey
  Matt Chulis
  Mike Clark
  Ricardo Clark
  Steve Clark
  Ryan Coiner
  Mac Cozier
  Alex Crognale
  Jeff Cunningham

D
  John DeBrito
  Miloš Degenek
  Eric Denton
  Luis Díaz
  Thomas Dooley
  Mark Dougherty
  Mike Duhaney
  Dilly Duka
  Brian Dunseth

E
  Emmanuel Ekpo
  Ancil Elcock
  Cory Elenio
  Simon Elliott
  Derrick Etienne Jr.
  Brad Evans

F
  Jason Farrell
  Mohamed Farsi
  Ethan Finlay
  Ryan Finley
  Shaun Francis
  Waylon Francis
  Liam Fraser
  Robin Fraser
  Brad Friedel
 Ross Friedman

G
  Romain Gall
  Freddy García
  Josh Gardner
  Jason Garey
  Bill Gaudette
  Eddie Gaven
  Eric Gehrig
  Kevan George
  Steve Gillespie
  Gláuber
  Cornell Glen
  Jimmy Glenn
  Giancarlo González
  Marcos González
  Mario Gori
  Ned Grabavoy
  Hernán Grana
  Ricci Greenwood †
  Andrew Gregor
  Mike Grella
  Alex Grendi
  Léandre Griffit
  Cole Grossman
  Andy Gruenebaum
  David Guzmán

H
  Marlon Hairston
  Jordan Hamilton
  Niko Hansen
  John Harkes
  Pat Harrington
  Tom Heinemann
  Frankie Hejduk
  Chris Henderson
  Ezra Hendrickson
  Stephen Herdsman
  Cucho Hernández †
  Nicolás Hernández
  Sergio Herrera †
  Andy Herron
  William Hesmer
  Federico Higuaín
  Aaron Horton †
  Erik Hurtado

I
  James Igbekeme
  Ricardo Iribarren
  Andy Iro

J
  Rob Jachym
  Adam Jahn
  Julius James
  Hector Jiménez
  Stern John
  Matt Jordan
  Miles Joseph
  Ryan Junge

K
  Kei Kamara
  Ola Kamara
  Aboubacar Keita
  Ryan Kelly
  Jon Kempin
  Doctor Khumalo
  Joel Kitamirike †
  Perry Kitchen
  Chris Klute
  Matt Kmosko
  Ritchie Kotschau

L
  Manny Lagos
  Matt Lampson
  Mike Lapper
  Emil Larsen
  Chris Leitch
  Steven Lenhart
  Mario Longo

M
  Cedrick Mabwati
  Brian Maisonneuve
  Connor Maloney
  Kekuta Manneh
  Pete Marino
  Chad Marshall
  Cristian Martínez
  Kyle Martino
  Alexandru Mățan
  Jeff Matteo
  Brian McBride
  Chad McCarty
  Jack McInerney
  Domenic Mediate
  Jimmy Medranda †
  Carlos Mendes
  Andrés Mendoza
  Jonathan Mensah
  Justin Meram
  Janusz Michallik
  Stefani Miglioranzi
  Sergio Miguez
  Todd Miller
  Sebastián Miranda
  Milovan Mirošević
  Adam Moffat
  Youness Mokhtar
  Kevin Molino
  Obi Moneme †
  Steven Moreira
  Alejandro Moreno
  Aidan Morris
  Brandon Moss
  Patrick Mullins

N
  Nicolai Næss
  Darlington Nagbe
  Matt Napoleon
  Krisztián Németh
  Joseph Ngwenya
  Pat Noonan

O
  Dominic Oduro
  Edward Opoku
  Danny O'Rourke
  Bo Oshoniyi
  Duncan Oughton

P
  Gino Padula
  Daniel Paladini
  Noah Palmer
  Isaiah Parente
  Michael Parkhurst
  Ross Paule
  Adrián Paz
  Trevor Perea †
  Andrew Peterson
  Rusty Pierce
  Alex Pineda Chacón
  Emanuel Pogatetz
  Dan Popik †
  Tom Presthus

Q
  Philip Quinton

R
  Jukka Raitala
  Ante Razov
  Emilio Rentería
  José Retiz
  Álvaro Rey
  Michael Ritch
  Robinho
  Mario Rodríguez
  Robbie Rogers
  Eloy Room
  Sebastián Rozental
  Silvio Rudman
  Dejan Rusmir
  Jacen Russell-Rowe
  Miroslaw Rzepa

S
  Mohammed Saeid
  Jorge Salcedo
  Matías Sánchez
  Will Sands
  Tony Sanneh
  Pedro Santos
  Rodrigo Saravia
  Gastón Sauro
  Dominic Schell
  Aaron Schoenfeld
  Kenny Schoeni †
  Mark Schulte
  Patrick Schulte †
  Erick Scott
  Rob Smith
  Juergen Sommer
  Eduardo Sosa
  Ben Speas
  Zack Steffen
  Kristinn Steindórsson
  Marcus Storey
  Brad Stuver
  Jamal Sutton
  Ben Swanson †
  Danny Szetela

T
  Andrew Tarbell
  Amro Tarek †
  Tony Tchani
  David Testo
  Jacob Thomas
  Billy Thompson
  Daniel Torres
  Jake Traeger
  Wil Trapp

U
  Kirk Urso

V
  Milton Valenzuela
  Olman Vargas
  Roland Vargas-Aguilera
  Eric Vasquez
  Agustín Viana
  Ricardo Virtuoso
  Nemanja Vuković

W
  Tyson Wahl
  Jonny Walker
  Diego Walsh
  Brandon Ward
  Tim Ward
  Konrad Warzycha
  Robert Warzycha
  Dante Washington
  Mark Watson
  Brian West
  Andy Williams
  JJ Williams
  Josh Williams
  Mark Williams
  Romario Williams
  John Wilmar Pérez
  Chris Wingert
  David Winner
  Ian Woan
  John Wolyniec
  A. J. Wood
  Vito Wormgoor
  Bradley Wright-Phillips

Y
  Todd Yeagley
  Yaw Yeboah
  Paul Young

Z
  Gyasi Zardes
  Sean Zawadzki
  Jed Zayner
  Lucas Zelarayán

By Nationality

Miscellaneous

Players that never played in a league match, but appeared in another competition:

  Ivan Becerra: one U.S. Open Cup appearance.
  Ray Burse: two CONCACAF Champions League appearances.
  Marshall Hollingsworth: one U.S. Open Cup appearance.
  George Josten: one U.S. Open Cup appearance.
  Logan Ketterer: one U.S. Open Cup appearance.
  Grant Lillard: one CONCACAF Champions League appearance.
  Jake Morris: one U.S. Open Cup appearance.
  Mike Mucino: two CONCACAF Giants Cup appearances.
  Stanley Nyazamba: one U.S. Open Cup appearance.
  Aubrey Perry: one U.S. Open Cup appearance.
  Santiago Prim: one U.S. Open Cup appearance.
  Ben Sweat: one U.S. Open Cup appearance.
  Korey Veeder: one U.S. Open Cup appearance.

Sources
 

Columbus Crew SC
 
Association football player non-biographical articles